Éric Despezelle (born 22 December 1974) is a French judoka.

Achievements

References

External links 
 
 

1974 births
Living people
French male judoka
Judoka at the 2000 Summer Olympics
Olympic judoka of France
Mediterranean Games bronze medalists for France
Mediterranean Games medalists in judo
Competitors at the 1997 Mediterranean Games